The Ngawapurua railway station on the Wairarapa Line was located in the Tararua District of the Manawatū-Whanganui region in New Zealand’s North Island.

Ngāawapūrua means in English "the blocked up river" or could also possibly mean "the meeting of the waters" 

The station opened on 11 December 1897 and closed on 29 May 1966.

References  

Buildings and structures in Manawatū-Whanganui
Rail transport in Manawatū-Whanganui
Tararua District
Defunct railway stations in New Zealand
Railway stations opened in 1897
Railway stations closed in 1966
1897 establishments in New Zealand
1966 disestablishments in New Zealand